Lou may be:

Lou language (Torricelli)
Lou language (Austronesian)